Jagjeet Singh Kular (16 April 1942 – 12 June 2017) was a Kenyan field hockey player. He competed in the men's tournament at the 1972 Summer Olympics.

References

External links
 

1942 births
2017 deaths
Kenyan male field hockey players
Olympic field hockey players of Kenya
Field hockey players at the 1972 Summer Olympics
Sportspeople from Mombasa
Kenyan people of Indian descent
Kenyan people of Punjabi descent
University of Nairobi alumni
Panjab University alumni
Kenyan emigrants to Canada
Canadian sportspeople of Indian descent
Canadian people of Punjabi descent